Caloschemia is a genus of moths of the family Callidulidae.

Species
Caloschemia pulchra Butler, 1878

References

Callidulidae